John Peter Sloan (27 February 1969 – 25 May 2020) was an English actor, comedian, educator, writer and former musician who lived and worked in Italy.

Biography 
Sloan was born to an Irish father and English mother. At the age of 16 he left England and traveled to Europe as a singer and guitarist. In 1990 he landed in Italy and, before becoming an author and comic actor, he founded a rock group, The Max, of which he was the frontman. The band remained active until 2000, when his daughter Dhalissia was born. He therefore decided to stop his tour and dedicated himself in Italy to teaching the English language, for which he proposed his own method, in which the playful component plays a decisive role. In 2011 he founded his first school, "John Peter Sloan - the School", in Milan, and in 2013 he opened a second office in Rome.

Death 
Plagued by asthma since birth and with a pulmonary emphysema, he died suddenly on the evening of 25 May 2020, at the age of 51, hit by a serious respiratory crisis in Menfi, Sicily, where he had lived for some years. The news was announced by his colleagues via Facebook.

References

External links 

1969 births
2020 deaths
Male actors from Birmingham, West Midlands
Comedians from Birmingham, West Midlands
Writers from Birmingham, West Midlands
English male comedians
English stand-up comedians
English male film actors
English male stage actors
English male television actors
English male voice actors
English male guitarists
Teachers of English
English people of Irish descent
English expatriates in Italy
20th-century English comedians
21st-century English comedians
20th-century English male actors
21st-century English male actors
20th-century English male writers
21st-century English male writers
20th-century English male singers
20th-century English singers
21st-century English male singers
21st-century English singers
Respiratory disease deaths in Sicily
Deaths from respiratory failure